Szafranki may refer to the following places:
Szafranki, Białystok County in Podlaskie Voivodeship (north-east Poland)
Szafranki, Mońki County in Podlaskie Voivodeship (north-east Poland)
Szafranki, Suwałki County in Podlaskie Voivodeship (north-east Poland)
Szafranki, Masovian Voivodeship (east-central Poland)
Szafranki, Warmian-Masurian Voivodeship (north Poland)